Dušan Lajović (born 30 June 1990) is a Serbian professional tennis player. Lajović has won one singles and two doubles titles on the ATP Tour. On 29 April 2019, Lajović reached his career-high singles ranking of world No. 23. On 21 September 2020, he peaked at No. 82 in the doubles rankings. 

He is best known for his clay-court game, kick serve and strong flowing groundstrokes, especially his one-handed backhand. Lajović regularly represents Serbia in team competitions, after playing in the now defunct World Team Cup in 2010 and 2011, he is a member of the Serbian Davis Cup team since 2012 and he contributed greatly to Serbia winning the inaugural ATP Cup in 2020, as he won four of six matches. He won his first singles tournament at the 2019 Croatia Open and reached his first Masters 1000 final at the 2019 Monte-Carlo Masters.

Tennis career

2007-2011
For a long time, Lajović primarily played on the Futures circuit and the Challenger circuit. 

In 2011 he qualified for the Kremlin Cup, and lost in the first round of the main draw. In the 2011 St. Petersburg Open, he reached the quarterfinals for the first time in his career.

2012: Davis Cup debut
In 2012, he began working with a new coach, Boris Bošnjaković, played in the Davis Cup for the first time, reached the finals of 2012 Orbetello Challenger and won the 2012 Samarkand Challenger.

2013: Davis Cup finalist
Replacing an injured Janko Tipsarevic, he played two live rubbers in the 2013 Davis Cup final, including the deciding rubber against Radek Stepanek of the Czech Republic. He was defeated comfortably in both but was praised by team-mate Novak Djokovic for how he coped with the big occasion.

2014: Major debut at Australian Open, French Open fourth round
His first appearance in the main draw of a grand slam was at Australian Open and he reached second round where he lost to Kei Nishikori. He bettered this at the French Open by reaching the fourth round where he was beaten in straight sets by then-world number one and eventual champion Rafael Nadal.

2015: First ATP doubles title & second Davis Cup quarterfinal
Partnered with Radu Albot, they won the Istanbul doubles title, marking the first ATP doubles title for the Serb. At the French Open he lost to eventual champion Stan Wawrinka in the second round in four sets.

2016: Third Davis Cup quarterfinal
At the Argentina Open, Lajović reached quarterfinals defeating world No. 12 John Isner en route. He reached the semifinals of the Brasil Open after beating top seed and world No. 20 Benoît Paire in the second round, that was his first tour-level semifinal appearance after losing all eight prior quarterfinals matches before in his career. This was followed by semifinal appearances at the 2016 Generali Open in Kitzbühel and the 2016 Los Cabos Open.

2017: Masters fourth round & Davis Cup semifinal
In Indian wells, the Serbian defeated five opponents to reach the fourth round eventually losing to Pablo Carreno Busta. 

His contributions in successful Davis Cup ties against Russia & Spain, resulted in Serbia making the semifinal where he defeated Lucas Pouille but lost to Jo-Wilfried Tsonga.

2018: Masters quarterfinal
At the Australian Open Lajović lost in five sets to US Open quarterfinalist Diego Schwartzman in his opening match. His next match was a five set loss to Miami Masters champion John Isner in a Davis Cup tie. A temporary return to the Challenger Tour resulted in winning the Open Region Guadeloupe. 

After qualifying for the Monte-Carlo Masters, he faced 12 time Grand Slam champion Novak Djokovic, losing in straight sets. At the Madrid Masters, he defeated former top ten player Richard Gasquet in the second round, followed by a victory over world No. 6 Juan Martín del Potro, before falling to world No. 8 Kevin Anderson in the quarterfinals. This clay-court season was topped off with a semifinal appearance at the Lyon Open and a five-set loss at the French Open to world No. 3 Alexander Zverev. 

Lajović's first-round match at Wimbledon was against defending champion & world No. 2 Roger Federer, he would lose in three quick sets. At the China Open he was able to secure his second victory over a top 10 player, defeating world No. 7 Grigor Dimitrov. On 15 October, Lajović reached the top 50 ranking for the first time in his career.

2019: Top 25; Masters final, maiden title
In January 2019, Lajović scored his 100th career victory and reached a new career-high ranking of world No. 45. Lajović secured his third top-ten victory in Miami defeating world No. 6 Kei Nishikori. At the Monte-Carlo Masters, he reached his maiden ATP Tour final without dropping a set. En route to the final, Lajović defeated former top 10 player David Goffin, reigning French Open finalist, world No. 5 Dominic Thiem, and world No. 14 Daniil Medvedev. His run ended in the final against Fabio Fognini in straight sets. Lajović climbed to a new career-high ranking of No. 24 at the conclusion of the tournament. Lajović won his first ATP Tour singles title at the Croatian Open in Umag, defeating Hungarian Attila Balázs in straight sets in the final.

2020: ATP Cup champion 
At the inaugural ATP Cup, Lajović assisted Serbia in making history as the first nation to win Davis, World Team and ATP Cups, winning four of six matches. At the Australian Open he defeated 2018 semifinalist Kyle Edmund in straight sets before losing to world no. 14 Diego Schwartzman in the third round.

2021: Australian Open fourth round
Lajović started his 2021 season representing Serbia at the ATP Cup. He lost to Milos Raonic of Canada and Jan-Lennard Struff of Germany. Despite winning last year, Serbia failed to defend the title. Seeded 23rd at the Australian Open, he reached the fourth round of a Grand Slam for a second time in his career. He ended up getting defeated by 6th seed Alexander Zverev.

Seeded third at the Open Sud de France in Montpellier, Lajović was eliminated in the second round by Dennis Novak. At the Rotterdam Open, he stunned World No. 3 and top seed, Daniil Medvedev, in the first round. With this win, Lajović was able to stop Medvedev from reaching number two in the ATP rankings. He was beaten in the second round by Borna Ćorić.

2022: Third consecutive ATP Cup
Lajović started his 2022 season by representing Serbia at the ATP Cup as the No. 1 player after the withdrawal of Novak Djokovic. Serbia was in Group A alongside Norway, Chile, and Spain. He ended up losing to Casper Ruud, Cristian Garín via retirement, and Roberto Bautista Agut. Serbia ended up third in Group A. Seeded sixth at the Sydney Classic, he was defeated in the second round by American Maxime Cressy. At the Australian Open, he was eliminated in the second round by world No. 31 Carlos Alcaraz.

Seeded fifth at the Argentina Open, Lajović was beaten in the second round by Argentinian Federico Coria. In Rio, he lost in the first round to Fernando Verdasco. At the Mexican Open, he was defeated in the second round by Tommy Paul. Playing at the Indian Wells Masters, he lost in the first round to Filip Krajinović. In Miami, he lost in the first round to Juan Manuel Cerúndolo.

Lajović kicked off his clay-court season at the Monte-Carlo Masters. He lost his second-round match to Grigor Dimitrov. Competing at the Serbia Open in his country, he was defeated in the first round by qualifier Taro Daniel. At the Estoril Open, he lost in the first round to fifth seed and eventual finalist, Frances Tiafoe. The week of May 1st saw Lajović playing at the Madrid Open. He stunned World No. 7 and fifth seed, Casper Ruud, in the second round. He fell in the third round to World No. 14 and 12th seed, Hubert Hurkacz. Getting past qualifying at the Italian Open, he lost in the first round to Alex de Minaur. Ranked No. 64 at the French Open, he was defeated in the first round by Sebastián Báez.

Seeded second at the Emilia-Romagna Open, an ATP Challenger event in Italy, Lajović reached the semifinals where he lost to Borna Ćorić.

Lajović played only one tournament to prepare for Wimbledon. At the Mallorca Championships, he was ousted from the tournament in the first round by Daniel Altmaier. Ranked 64 at Wimbledon, he lost in the second round to Alexander Bublik.

Seeded second at the Salzburg Open, an ATP Challenger event in Austria, Lajović made it to the quarterfinals where he lost to sixth seed and eventual champion, Thiago Monteiro.

He finished the year ranked outside of the top 100 at No. 102 on 21 November 2022, his lowest year-end ranking in 10 years.

In December he won the 2022 Maia Challenger, his seventh at this level.

2023: Three Golden Swing quarterfinals in Argentina, Rio and Chile Opens 
In January, Lajovic lost in three tight sets in the qualifying of ASB Classic to Christopher Eubanks. At the Australian Open, he lost in the first round in four sets against 20th seed Denis Shapovalov.

In February, during the Golden Swing in South America, he reached  as a qualifier the quarterfinals of the Argentina Open after defeating reigning Cordoba Open champion Sebastian Baez in the first round. In the second round, he defeated Camilo Ugo Carabelli in straight sets to reach his first quarterfinal of the season. In the quarterfinals, he was defeated by the top seed, Carlos Alcaraz.
At the Rio Open, Lajovic reached his second quarterfinal after defeating fifth seed Diego Schwartzman in the first round and compatriot Laslo Djere in the second, both in straight sets. In the quarterfinals, he was defeated again by the top seed Carlos Alcaraz.
For the second time, he reached back-to-back quarterfinals at the Chile Open by defeating again Camilo Ugo Carabelli in the first round and Juan Manuel Cerundolo in the round of 16. In the quarterfinals, he lost to Tomás Martín Etcheverry.

Playing style
Lajović plays his best games on clay courts, with a strong baseline game capable of creating decent pace on both wings. He can create heavy kick on his serve, especially effective on clay.

Personal life
Lajović was born 30 June 1990 in Belgrade, Serbia to parents Marina and Dragiša Lajović. He started playing tennis when he was seven years old in T.K. Stara Pazova and later continued in T.K. Partizan Belgrade. He is in longtime relationship with Serbian medical doctor Lidija Mikic.  He lives in Stara Pazova, Serbia where he owns a coffee shop.

Performance timelines

Singles
Current through the 2023 Indian Wells.

Doubles

Significant finals

ATP Masters 1000 finals

Singles: 1 (1 runner-up)

ATP career finals

Singles: 2 (1 title, 1 runner-up)

Doubles: 3 (2 titles, 1 runner-up)

Team competition

Finals: 2 (1 title, 1 runner–up)

ATP Challenger Tour and ITF Futures finals

Singles: 17 (12 titles, 5 runner–ups)

Doubles: 6 (4 titles, 2 runner–ups)

Record against other players

Record against top 10 players
Lajović's match record against those who have been ranked in the top 10, with those who have been No. 1 in bold (ATP World Tour, Grand Slam and Davis Cup main draw matches).

  Karen Khachanov 4–0
  Lucas Pouille 3–1
  Fernando Verdasco 3–2
  Richard Gasquet 2–0
  Gilles Simon 2–0
  Jack Sock 2–0
  Felix Auger-Aliassime 2–0
  Mikhail Youzhny 2–0
  Daniil Medvedev 2–1
  Diego Schwartzman 2–3
  Juan Martín del Potro 1–0
  Taylor Fritz 1–0
  Andrey Rublev 1–0
  Janko Tipsarević 1–0
  Nicolás Almagro 1–1
  David Goffin 1–1
  Cameron Norrie 1–1
  Grigor Dimitrov 1–2
  Kei Nishikori 1–2
  Milos Raonic 1–2
  Stefanos Tsitsipas 1–2
  Pablo Carreño Busta 1–3
  Casper Ruud 1–3
  Dominic Thiem 1–5
  John Isner 1–6
  Tomáš Berdych 0–1
  Tommy Haas 0–1
  Juan Mónaco 0–1
  Tommy Robredo 0–1
  Novak Djokovic 0–2
  Roger Federer 0–2
  Fabio Fognini 0–2
  Hubert Hurkacz 0–2
  Gaël Monfils 0–2
  Denis Shapovalov 0–2
  Radek Štěpánek 0–2
  Stan Wawrinka 0–2
  Carlos Alcaraz 0–3
  Kevin Anderson 0–3
  Marin Čilić 0–3
  Rafael Nadal 0–3
  Jo Wilfried Tsonga 0–3
  Alexander Zverev 0–4
  Roberto Bautista Agut 0–5 

*

Top 10 wins
He has a  record against players who were, at the time the match was played, ranked in the top 10.

*

References

External links

 
 
 

1990 births
Living people
Serbian male tennis players
Tennis players from Belgrade